The Nikkatsu Roman Porno films were a series of theatrical Japanese softcore pornographic films produced by the movie studio Nikkatsu from November, 1971, until May, 1988. The Japanese word 'roman' refers to novels, and derives from the Latin/French word, 'roman.'  This is a list of the films in that series.

1971

1972

1973

1974

1975

1976

1977

1978

1979

1980

1981

1982

1983

1984

1985

1986

1987

1988

See also
 Pink film

Notes

Sources
 Allmovie
 Internet Movie Database
 Japanese Movie Database
 
 

Pink films
Japanese pornography
Lists of films by studio

 
Pornographic film series